The Asociación Mexicana de Bibliotecarios A. C. (AMBAC) is a professional association of librarians in Mexico. It operates from headquarters in Colonia del Valle in the Benito Juarez borough of Mexico City. The organization began in 1924 as the Asociación de Bibliotecarios Mexicanos, reformed in 1954. Two years later AMBAC became legally recognized. Presidents of the organization have included Tobías Chávez Lavista, and Saúl Armendáriz Sánchez.

Mission and Vision 
AMBAC's Mission:

"La AMBAC es la asociación civil vinculada a la gestión bibliotecaria en todos sus aspectos como el fomento y desarrollo de las bibliotecas, sus servicios de información y su participación con el desarrollo comunitarios a través de sus actividades de extensión."

"The AMBAC is the civil association linked to library management in all its aspects such as the promotion and development of libraries, their information services and their participation in community development through their outreach activities"

AMBAC'S Vision:

"Queremos seguir siendo la organización líder de bibliotecarios que impulse el desarrollo laboral y profesional de sus asociados donde las acciones que realicen desde sus centros de trabajo repercutan directamente en el desarrollo sostenible de nuestro país de manera incluyente."

"We want to continue to be the leading organization for librarians that promotes the labor and professional development of its associates, where the actions they carry out from their work has a direct impact on the sustainable development of our country in an inclusive manner."

See also
 List of libraries in Mexico

Notes

References

This article incorporates information from the Spanish Wikipedia.

Further reading
Issued by the association
 Boletín de la Asociación de Bibliotecarios Mexicanos, 1924-
 Acta Constitutiva de la Asociación Mexicana de Bibliotecarios, A. C. (Escritura 30679) México: 1965.
 , 1966-
 (1977) Directorio de bibliotecarios y documentalistas
 (1984) Encuentro de Escritores, Libreros, Editores y Bibliotecarios, de Monterrey
 
 (1999) La democratización del acceso a la lectura
 La red nacional de bibliotecas públicas 1983-1998
 Manual para promotores de bibliotecas 
 Memorias de las Jornadas Mexicanas de Bibliotecología

About the association

External links
 Official site.

1965 establishments in Mexico
Library-related professional associations
Mexican librarians
Organizations established in 1965